Martigné-sur-Mayenne is a commune in the Mayenne department in north-western France.

The commune contains the Château de la Motte-Husson, owned by Dick Strawbridge and Angel Adoree, which features in the Channel 4 television series Escape to the Chateau.

See also
Communes of Mayenne

References

External links
 
 

Martignesurmayenne